Duke's Pass or Dukes Pass is a pass on the A821 road between Aberfoyle and Brig o' Turk in the glen of the Trossachs in the Scottish Highlands.

The name only appears on modern Ordnance Survey maps, but is in common use locally. The road was built by the Duke of Montrose in 1885, hence the name.

References

Mountain passes of Scotland